The Samareitikon (Greek: τὸ Σαμαρειτικὸν) is the name given to the Greek translation of the Samaritan Pentateuch.

The Samareitikon is obtained only from marginal notes in other manuscripts and quotations in Origen. As Samuel Kohn has shown, these passages show dependencies on the Samaritan Targum. According to Emanuel Tov, however, it is only an early revision of the Septuagint text, which could also be a Samaritan version of the Septuagint. This thesis may be supported by the text version of an inscription found in Thessaloniki with the Aaronic blessing Book of Numbers 6,22-27 in a building in the 4th century Samaritan synagogue.

References

Further reading
 Frankel, Zacharias ‘Über den Einfluss der palälastinischen Exegese auf die alexandrinische Hermeneutik‘ p. 127. Leipzig, 1831.
 Field, Frederick. Origenis Hexaplorum quae supersunt sive veterum interpretum graecorum in totum Vetus Testamentum fragmenta. Oxford 1875 [Neudruck 1964].
 Glaue, Paul; Rahlfs, Alfred. Fragmente einer griechischen Übersetzung des samaritanischen Pentateuchs. Mitteilungen des Septuaginta-Unternehmens 1,2. Berlin 1911.
 Tov, Emanuel. Pap. Gießen 13, 19, 22, 26. A Revision of the LXX? In: Revue Biblique 78 (1971), S. 355–383.
 Tov, Emanuel. ‘Pap. Giessen 13, 19, 22, 26: A Revision of the Septuagint?’ Pages 439-475 in The Greek and Hebrew Bible: Collected Essays on the Septuagint. Leiden: Brill, 1999.
 Bülow-Jacobsen, A and Strange, J. ‘P. Carlsberg 49: Fragment of an Unknown Greek Translation of the Old Testament (Exod. 3,2-6. 12-13. 16-19). Same Codex as H 16 (Strasb. inv. 748)’ Archiv für Papyrusforschung und verwandte Gebiete 32 (1986): 15-21.
 Geiger, Abraham. ‘Einleitung in die biblischen Schriften.’ Pages 1-279 in Nachgelassene Schriften. Vol 4. Edited by Ludwig Geiger. Berlin: Louis Gershel Verlagsbuchhandlung, 1876.
 Joosten, Jan. ‘The Samareitikon and the Samaritan Tradition’ Pages 346-59 in Die Septuaginta - Text, Wirkung, Rezeption. Edited by Kraus von Wolfgang and Siegfried Kreuzer. Tübingen : Mohr Siebeck, 2014.
 Joosten, Jan. ‘Septuagint and Samareitikon.’ Pages 1-15 in Author to Copyist: Essays on the Composition, Redaction, and Transmission of the Hebrew Bible in Honor of Zipi Talshir. Edited by Cana Werman. Winona Lake, IN: Eisenbrauns, 2015.
 Kohn, Samuel. ‘Samareitikon und Septuaginta’. Monatsschrift für Geschichte und Wissenschaft des Judentums 38 (1894), 1-7, 49-67.
 Pummer, Reinhard. ‘The Greek Bible and the Samaritans’. Revue des Études Juives 157/3-4 (1998): 269-358.
 Marsh, Bradley J. ‘The Samareitikon, Carl 49, and the κατα Σαμαρειτων Marginalia in CODEX M‘. SBL, (2016).
 Crown, Alan David. ‘Samaritan Scribes and Manuscripts‘, pp. 15-17. Mohr Siebeck, 2001.
 Waaserstein, Jacob. ‘Samareitikon‘ CSS, 209-210
 Noja, S. ‘The Samareitikon‘, TS, 408-412
 Waltke, B.K. ‘Prolegomena to the Samaritan Pentateuch‘, HTR, 57 (1965): 463/464. Idem, ‘Prolegomena to the Samaritan Pentateuch‘, (Harvard University Ph.D thesis), (University Microfilms, 1965).
 Marcos, Natalio (2000). The Septuagint in Context: Introduction to the Greek Version of the Bible. Brill. pp. 167-169.
 Schenker, A. ”Textgeschichtliches zum Samaritanischen Pentateuch und Samareitikon,” in Samaritans: Past and Present: Current Studies, Studia Samaritana 5 (eds. M. Mor und F. V. Reiterer; Berlin und New York: De Gruyter, 2000), pp. 105-121.

External links 
 The Gießen fragments P.B.U.G. inv. 13, P.B.U.G. inv. 19, 22 und 26 

Samaritan texts
Septuagint
Torah
Translations into Greek